Emilia is a genus of herbaceous plants in the family sunflower family, known as tasselflower or pualele.

The members of the genus are distributed mainly in the tropics and sub-tropics of Africa and Asia. Some species have also been placed in the genus Cacalia.

Species accepted by the Plants of the World Online as of 2022:

References

External links

Further reading
  

Senecioneae
Asteraceae genera
Taxa named by Henri Cassini